Matthew John Smith (born 22 March 1978) is an Australian Liberal politician who served in the Tasmanian House of Assembly from 1998 to 2002.

Smith was elected to the Tasmanian House of Assembly in 1998 as a member for the seat of Franklin. He became the youngest member of any parliament in Australia upon election in 1998 at 20 years of age.

Smith stepped down shortly before the 2002 election after his father was charged with stealing from his employer and a court was told some of the money may have been used to fund his campaign.  His father was later acquitted of all charges.

References

1978 births
Liberal Party of Australia members of the Parliament of Tasmania
Living people
Members of the Tasmanian House of Assembly
21st-century Australian politicians